Đinh Xuân Việt (born 10 November 1983) is a Vietnamese former footballer who last played as a goalkeeper for Nam Định.

References

1983 births
Living people
Vietnamese footballers
Haiphong FC players
Ho Chi Minh City FC players
Nam Định F.C. players
V.League 1 players
Association football goalkeepers